Julián Carrón (born 25 February 1950) is a Spanish Catholic priest, and theologian and the former leader of the Italian Communion and Liberation movement.

References

Communion and Liberation
20th-century Spanish Roman Catholic priests
Linguists from Spain
20th-century Spanish Roman Catholic theologians
1950 births
Living people
21st-century Spanish Roman Catholic priests